The Wellstone is a 2003 hard science fiction novel by Wil McCarthy. It was the first sequel to 2000's The Collapsium, starting what was to become a four-part Queendom of Sol series.

Overview
In The Wellstone, McCarthy explores the lives of immortal humans known as immorbids in the future.  Nanotechnology has created the wellstone, programmable matter that can emulate nearly any other form of matter, and nanotech fax machines that can not only fabricate objects on demand, but store and retrieve human bodies (with minds intact), cure disease or reverse aging, or be used as teleporters.  Ultradense exotic matter known as collapsium makes gravity manipulation and faster-than-light communication possible.  Humanity has formed a solar system–wide society based on monarchy.

Many of the technologies in this novel are also described in McCarthy's 2003 nonfiction book, Hacking Matter.

References

2003 American novels
2003 science fiction novels
American science fiction novels
Novels by Wil McCarthy
Hard science fiction
Nanotechnology in fiction
Teleportation in fiction
Faster-than-light communication
Bantam Spectra books